Hygien-Nicaise Lombocko (born 11 June 1969) is a Congolese sprinter. He competed in the men's 4 × 100 metres relay at the 1988 Summer Olympics.

References

1969 births
Living people
Athletes (track and field) at the 1988 Summer Olympics
Republic of the Congo male sprinters
Olympic athletes of the Republic of the Congo
Place of birth missing (living people)